Results of Spain women's national basketball team since 1963, as recognized by the Spanish Basketball Federation: Olympic Games, World Cups, EuroBaskets and their respective qualifying tournaments, as well as two editions of the Mediterranean Games when the A-team was involved. Also included, friendly games and tournaments against national teams.

Note: updated through 27 November 2022

See also 
 Spain women's national basketball team
 Medal winners in Spain women's national basketball team
 Spain women's national basketball team head to head
 Spanish Basketball Federation
 Basketball at the Summer Olympics
 FIBA Basketball World Cup
 EuroBasket Women

References

External links 

 Official website
 FIBA profile

Spain women's national basketball team
Basketball games by national team